Allen Frank Warden (March 20, 1852 – September 29, 1927) was an American newspaper editor and politician.

Warden was born in Beloit, Wisconsin. He moved with his family to Darlington, Wisconsin. He graduated from University of Wisconsin in 1873. He was the editor of the Plymouth Register newspaper in Plymouth, Wisconsin. He served as the Sheboygan County Superintendent of Public Schools. In 1891, Warden served in the Wisconsin Assembly and was a Democrat. He then moved to Madison, Wisconsin and Waukesha, Wisconsin where he continued to work in the newspaper business. He moved with his wife to Britton, Oklahoma County, Oklahoma. He died, at his home, in Britton, Oklahoma.

Notes

External links

1852 births
1927 deaths
People from Beloit, Wisconsin
People from Darlington, Wisconsin
People from Plymouth, Wisconsin
People from Oklahoma County, Oklahoma
University of Wisconsin–Madison alumni
Editors of Wisconsin newspapers
Democratic Party members of the Wisconsin State Assembly